Zoran Petkovski is a former Macedonian professional basketball Guard. He is a head coach of Pelister of Macedonian First League.

References

External links
 Eurobasket Profile
 RealGM Profile

1978 births
Living people
Macedonian men's basketball players
Guards (basketball)
Sportspeople from Bitola
Macedonian basketball coaches